Kallinger is a surname. Notable people with the surname include:

Christian Kallinger (born 1982), Austrian darts player
Joseph Kallinger (1935–1996), American serial killer

See also
Killinger